Robert Pitcairn (1836 – 1909) was a Scottish-American railroad executive.

Robert Pitcairn may also refer to:

 Robert Pitcairn (antiquary) (1793–1855), Scottish antiquary and scholar
 Robert Pitcairn (commendator) (died 1584), Scottish administrator, diplomat and judge, secretary of state and commendator of Dunfermline
 Robert Pitcairn (Royal Navy officer) (1752–c. 1770), Royal Navy midshipman, first European to sight Pitcairn Island
 Robert Pitcairn (athlete), (born 1938), Canadian sport shooter